Kiokee is an unincorporated community in Columbia County in the U.S. state of Georgia.

History
A post office called Kiokee was established in 1859 and remained in operation until 1900. The community took its name from nearby Kiokee Creek.

See also
Kiokee Baptist Church, historic church  to the southwest in Appling, Georgia

References

Unincorporated communities in Columbia County, Georgia
Unincorporated communities in Georgia (U.S. state)